Mariah Denigan (born May 3, 2003) is an American swimmer, who specializes in open water and freestyle events. At the 2022 FINA World Swimming Championships in Budapest Hungary, Denigan swim both the 10km open water (finishing 15th place), and the USA Mixed Team Relay (finishing in 7th). Deniagn won the silver medal in the women's 800 metre freestyle event at the 2019 Pan American Games held in Lima, Peru. She also competed in the 400 metre and 1500 metre freestyle events. In the women's 400 metre individual medley event she finished in 5th place in the final.

References

External links 
 

Living people
2003 births
People from Fairfield, Ohio
American female freestyle swimmers
American female medley swimmers
Pan American Games silver medalists for the United States
Pan American Games medalists in swimming
Medalists at the 2019 Pan American Games
Swimmers at the 2019 Pan American Games
21st-century American women
Indiana Hoosiers women's swimmers